Thomas Horton may refer to:

Thomas Horton (soldier) (1603–1649), English soldier
Thomas Horton (Gresham College) (died 1673), English theology professor and college head
Thomas Horton, Governor of the Isle of Man 1725–1736
Thomas H. Horton (1859-1943), American farmer and politician
Thomas R. Horton (1823–1894), American congressman
Thomas W. Horton (born 1961), American airline executive
Thomas W. Horton (RAF officer) (1919–2021), New Zealand bomber pilot 
Thomas Horton (canoeist) (1926–2014), American Olympic canoer
Thomas Horton (cricketer) (1871–1932), English cricketer
Thomas Horton (Gloucester), English landowner
Tommy Horton (1941–2017), English golfer
Thomas Horton (politician) (died 1919), member of the Legislative Council of Fiji and Mayor of Blenheim

Characters 
Tom Horton, on American soap opera Days of our Lives
Tommy Horton (Days of Our Lives), on American soap opera Days of our Lives